Lars Anders Vilhelm Bern (born 21 October 1942) is a Swedish engineer, doctor of technology, author and debater.

Education and experience 

Bern has a degree in engineering physics from Chalmers University of Technology and received a Ph.D. in chemical reaction engineering with mathematical modeling of hydrogenation of vegetable oils.

He has worked for Volvo with the development of alternative fuels and he has been the CEO of Svensk Metanolutveckling, AB ÅF, Svenska Miljöforskningsinstitutet IVL and Konglomeratet Incentive (later Gambro) where he spoke of self-made energy within the paper industry.

He has also been the councilor of environmental topics for ABB. He specializes in physics, environmentalism, medicine and geopolitics.

Bern is member of Royal Swedish Academy of Engineering Sciences and its former environmental committee. Previously he had been the chairman and on the board of several corporations and organizations, including Det Naturliga Stegets Miljöinstitut och Cancerfonden. Bern is also a member of a foundation part-owning the newspaper Svenska Dagbladet.

Bern has stated if Sweden did not intended to maintain nuclear power, it would be necessary to produce it for other countries for environmental reasons. In his book, "Varför försvinner våra kronjuveler", Bern criticized Swedish corporations, specially the Wallenberg-family, for moving their industries to third world countries and taking away jobs from the Swedish market.

Climate change debate 

Lars Bern has 35 years of experience in environmental studies and is the founder of foundation Det Naturliga Steget and was previously CEO of Ångpanneföreningen and IVL (Swedish Environmental Institute). In 2008, Bern published an article originally from News Mill but borrowed by Archive.is claiming that "20 top scientists agree that carbon dioxide does not affect the environment". In Klimatupplysningen, a Swedish climate debating movement, Bern stated that the climate change movement is similar to a religious doom cult which legitimizes politicians' rights in the West to increase taxes. In an article published by DagensSPS in 2009, Bern claimed that the "picture of the climate threats are exaggerated.". In an interview on Swebbtv with the host Mikael Willgert, Bern stated that climate politics is a propaganda tool used to frighten the Swedish public. Bern has also claimed that SVT (Sweden's State Television) spread disinformation about climate change and distort research information about melting ice. Bern states, contradicting the scientific consensus on climate change, that the climate change is due to natural causes and that the anthropogenic effect is minimal. Bern has said that reporter Kerstin Unger-Salén, wife of Anders Wijkman, head of the Club of Rome, attacked a straw-man and spread disinformation about Bern's standpoint on the climate change debate. Bern has also stated that the "doomsday climate sect is making Sweden and Swedish families poor".

Skeptic of globalism 

In an article from Världen Idag, Bern said that the United Nations' plan, Agenda 2030, aims transfer of power to global corporations from democratically elected leaders and sovereign nations. He said, "The anglo-American hegemony has long ruled the world. The Royal Navy, the British Royal Navy, occupied the trading routes. Their role with control over the world trade was handed over to the Americans who now are trying to exercise power by control the trading routes. The US position is however failing. Who is it really that has ruled up to now? At the beginning it was the royal. Then the democratic institutions came, but now the power is slowly slipping out of their hands. The big global corporates that have developed dominates the economy and their final goal is total and unequivocal power". Bern has stated that there are massive consequences for the Swedish public economy, saying wages stagnate due to the migration policy of the Swedish government and that debts are rising. Bern has criticized George Soros calling him an "evil villain".

Expressen reported that Bern was involved in forming the environmental policy for the Sweden Democrats.

Bibliography

References 

1942 births
Living people
Swedish engineers
Chalmers University of Technology alumni
Members of the Royal Swedish Academy of Engineering Sciences
Swedish bloggers